The 2007 Philippine House of Representatives elections were held on May 14, 2007, to elect members to the House of Representatives of the Philippines to serve in the 14th Congress of the Philippines from June 30, 2007, until June 30, 2010. The Philippines uses parallel voting for seats in the House of Representatives.

In district elections, 219  single-member constituencies elect one member of the House of Representatives. The candidate with the highest number of votes wins that district's seat. In the party-list election, the parties with at least 2% of the national vote were elected, and 21 representatives were elected  However, later in 2007 the Supreme Court ruled in Banat vs. COMELEC that the 2% quota was unconstitutional, and that the sectoral representatives should comprise exactly 20% of the House. This led to the increase in the number of sectoral representatives to 51.

The administration-led TEAM Unity maintained control of the House of Representatives although the opposition-backed Genuine Opposition won control of the Senate. Incumbent Speaker Jose de Venecia Jr. of Pangasinan was elected Speaker after being the only one nominated: 186 voted for De Venecia, 1 against (Eduardo Joson) and 24 abstentions.

Campaign

Genuine Opposition
The Genuine Opposition (GO) targeted to win at least 80 seats to be able to impeach President Gloria Macapagal Arroyo; however the administration's TEAM Unity prevented GO in winning several of those seats by fielding in strong candidates against GO in those districts.

Lakas vs. KAMPI
The administration's two main parties, Lakas-CMD and Kabalikat ng Malayang Pilipino (KAMPI), was seen to win majority of the seats, with most contests contested by the two parties. This inevitably produced a split in the administration ranks on who would be their candidate for Speaker in the impending victory. However, the two parties were united in supporting President Arroyo and were able to prevent any impeachment proceeding against her or her allies from reaching the Senate.

Lakas-CMD party leader and House Speaker Jose de Venecia was challenged by KAMPI's Pablo P. Garcia for the speakership in the incoming 14th Congress of the Philippines which has caused a battle between administration allies. Recently, Garcia was accused by Parañaque 1st District Rep. Eduardo Ziacita and Manila 6th District Rep. Bienvenido Abante, Jr. both under the party Lakas-CMD of using Government Service Insurance System or GSIS pension funds care of Garcia's son GSIS Vice-Chairman, General Manager and President Winston Garcia to bribe congressmen of PHP 300,000 to 400,000 to support his father's speakership bid.

Retiring and term limited incumbents

Lakas-CMD
Agusan del Norte's 1st District: Leovigildo Banaag: Term-limited in 2007
Agusan del Norte's 2nd District: Ma. Angelica Rosedell Amante
Albay's 3rd District: Joey Salceda: Term-limited in 2007, ran and won as Governor of Albay
Basilan's Lone District: Gerry Salapuddin: Term-limited in 2007
Bohol's 3rd District: Eladio Jala: Term-limited in 2007
Bukidnon's 3rd District: Juan Miguel Zubiri: Term-limited in 2007, ran and won as Senator (12th place, first 12 are elected). However, replaced by Koko Pimentel in 2011
Bulacan's 1st District: Wilhelmino Sy-Alvarado: Term-limited in 2007, ran and won as Vice Governor of Bulacan
Cagayan de Oro City's Lone District: Constantino Jaraula: Term-limited in 2007, ran and won as Mayor of Cagayan de Oro
Cebu's 4th District: Clavel Martinez: Term-limited in 2007, ran and lost as Vice Governor of Cebu to incumbent Greg Sanchez
Compostela Valley's 2nd District: Prospero Amatong: Term-limited in 2007
Davao del Norte's 2nd District: Antonio Floirendo, Jr.: Term-limited in 2007
Ilocos Sur's 1st District: Salacnib Baterina: Term-limited in 2007
Leyte's 3rd District: Eduardo Veloso: Term-limited in 2007
Mandaluyong's Lone District: Benjamin Abalos, Jr.: Ran and won as Mayor of Mandaluyong
Manila's 1st District: Ernesto Nieva: Term-limited in 2007
Marinduque's Lone District: Edmundo Reyes, Jr.: Term-limited in 2007
Pasig's Lone District: Robert "Dodot" Jaworski, Jr.: Ran and lost in the Mayoralty race in Pasig to incumbent councilor Robert Eusebio
San Jose del Monte City's Lone District: Eduardo Roquero: Ran and won as Mayor of San Jose del Monte City
Siquijor's Lone District: Orlando Fua, Jr.: Term-limited in 2007, ran and won as Governor of Siquijor
Sulu's 1st District: Hussin Amin: Term-limited in 2007
Surigao del Norte's 2nd District: Ace Barbers: Term-limited in 2007, ran and won as Governor of Surigao del Norte
Surigao del Sur's 1st District: Prospero Pichay: Term-limited in 2007, ran and lost in the Senatorial race (16th place, first 12 are elected)
Valenzuela City's 1st District: Jose Emmanuel Carlos: Ran and lost in the Mayoralty race in Valenzuela City to incumbent Sherwin Gatchalian

Kabalikat ng Malayang Pilipino
Antipolo City's 2nd District: Victor Sumulong: Term-limited in 2007, ran and won as Mayor of Antipolo City
Batangas 4th District: Oscar Gozos: Ran and won as Mayor of Lipa
Davao Oriental's 1st District: Corazon Malanyaon: Ran and won as Governor of Davao Oriental
La Union's 2nd District: Tomas Dumpit: Term-limited in 2007
Misamis Oriental's 2nd District: Augusto Baculio: Term-limited in 2007
Pangasinan's 2nd District: Amado Espino, Jr.: Ran and won as Governor of Pangasinan
Pangasinan's 3rd District: Generoso Tulagan: Term-limited in 2007
Pasay City's Lone District: Consuelo Dy: Ran and lost in the Mayoralty race in Pasay to Wenceslao "Peewee" Trinidad

Kilusang Bagong Lipunan
Ilocos Norte's 1st District: Imee Marcos: Term-limited in 2007

Laban ng Demokratikong Filipino
Iloilo's 5th District: Rolex Suplico: Term-limited in 2007, ran and won as Vice Governor of Iloilo
Makati's 2nd District: Agapito Aquino: Term-limited in 2007
Negros Oriental's 1st District: Jacinto Paras: Term-limited in 2007
Nueva Vizcaya's Lone District: Rodolfo Agbayani: Ran and lost as Governor of Nueva Vizcaya to incumbent Luisa Lloren-Cuaresma

Liberal Party
Bataan's 1st District: Antonio Roman: Term-limited in 2007
Bukidnon's 1st District: J.R. Nereus Acosta: Term-limited in 2007
Kalinga's Lone District: Lawrence Wacnang: Term-limited in 2007
Laguna's 3rd District: Danton Bueser: Term-limited in 2007, ran and lost in the Mayoralty race in San Pablo to incumbent Vicente Amante
Malabon-Navotas's Lone District: Federico Sandoval: Term-limited in 2007, ran and lost in the Mayoral race in Navotas to incumbent Tobias Reynald Tiangco
Manila's 4th District: Rodolfo Bacani: Term-limited in 2007, ran and lost in the Mayoralty race in Manila to incumbent Senator Alfredo Lim
Northern Samar's 1st District: Harlin Abayon: Term-limited in 2007
Quezon's 1st District: Rafael Nantes: Term-limited in 2007, ran and won as Governor of Quezon
Tarlac's 2nd District: Benigno Aquino III: Term-limited in 2007, ran and won in the Senatorial race (6th place, first 12 are elected)

Nacionalista Party
Manila's 5th District: Joey Hizon: Term-limited in 2007, ran and lost in the Vice Mayoral race in Manila to incumbent Councilor Isko Moreno
Taguig City-Pateros's Lone District: Alan Peter Cayetano: Term-limited in 2007, ram and won in the Senatorial race (9th place, first 12 are elected)

Nationalist People's Coalition
Apayao's Lone District: Elias Bulut, Jr.: Term-limited in 2007, ran and won as Governor
Cagayan's 1st District: Juan Ponce Enrile, Jr.: Term-limited in 2007
Caloocan's 2nd District: Luis Asistio: Ran and lost in the Mayoralty race in Caloocan to incumbent Enrico Echiverri
Camiguin's Lone District: Jurdin Jesus Romualdo: Term-limited in 2007, ran and won as Governor
Cebu's 2nd District: Simeon Kintanar: Term-limited in 2007
Cebu's 3rd District: Antonio Yapha: Term-limited in 2007
Cotabato's 2nd District: Gregorio Ipong: Term-limited in 2007
Davao City's 3rd District: Ruy Elias Lopez: Term-limited in 2007
Davao del Sur's 1st District: Douglas Cagas: Term-limited in 2007, ran and won as Governor
Laguna's 1st District: Uliran Joaquin: Term-limited in 2007, ran and lost in the Mayoralty race in San Pedro, Laguna to Calixto Cataquiz
Lanao del Norte's 1st District: Alipio Badelles: Term-limited in 2007
Lanao del Sur's 2nd District: Benansing Macarambong: Term-limited in 2007
Masbate's 2nd District: Emilio Espinosa: Term-limited in 2007
Negros Occidental's 4th District: Carlos Cojuangco: Term-limited in 2007
Negros Oriental's 2nd District: Emilio Macias: Term-limited in 2007, ran and won as Governor
Nueva Ecija's 1st District: Josefina Joson: Term-limited in 2007
Pampanga's 1st District: Francis Nepomuceno: Term-limited in 2007, ran and won as Mayor of Angeles City
Rizal's 2nd District: Isidro Rodriguez, Jr.: Term-limited in 2007
Sorsogon's 1st District: Francis Escudero: Term-limited in 2007, ran and won in the Senatorial Race (2nd Place, first 12 are elected)
Tarlac's 1st District: Gilberto Teodoro, Jr.: Term-limited in 2007, later appointed as Secretary of the Department of National Defense
Zamboanga del Norte's 2nd District: Roseller Barinaga: Term-limited in 2007, ran and lost in the Mayoralty race in Dipolog City to Evelyn Uy

Results

District elections results
District representatives are allocated 80% of the seats in the House:

Party-list election result

Party-list representatives are allocated 20% of the seats in the House; however, due to the 2% threshold and the 3-seat cap rule, the 20% requirement was not met. On the BANAT vs. COMELEC decision of the Supreme Court, it declared the 2% threshold unconstitutional; instead it mandated that parties surpassing the 2% threshold automatically having seats, then allocating one seat for every party with less than 2% of the vote until the 20% allocation was met. With the formula used, this meant that the party with the highest number of votes usually gets three seats, the other parties with 2% or more of the vote winning two seats, and parties with less than 2% of the vote getting one seat.

References

External links
Official website of the Commission on Elections
 Official website of National Movement for Free Elections (NAMFREL)
Official website of the Parish Pastoral Council for Responsible Voting (PPCRV)

Media websites
Halalan 2007 - Election coverage by ABS-CBN
Eleksyon 2007 - Election coverage by GMA Network
Eleksyon 2007 - Election coverage by the Philippine Daily Inquirer

2007
2007 in the Philippines
2007 Philippine general election
2007 elections in Asia